Angela Anaconda is an animated children's television series created by Joanna Ferrone and Sue Rose. The show ran for three seasons, from 1999 to 2001, for a total of 65 episodes.

Premise 
The show focuses on the adventures of an eight-year-old girl named Angela in the fictional town of Tapwater Springs. Other characters include Angela's three best friends and several antagonists, primarily Nanette Manoir.

Episodes

Characters

Main 
Angela Anaconda (voiced by Sue Rose) is a tomboyish, imaginative, freckle-faced eight-year-old girl who eschews the femininity commonly associated with other girls her age. She resides in the town of Tapwater Springs with her parents, two dimwitted older twin brothers Mark and Derek, her younger sister Lulu, and closest friends, Johnny Abatti, Gina Lash and Gordy Rhinehart. In every episode of the series, Angela will engage in at least one dream sequence. The majority of these feature her rivals Nanette Manoir and Mrs. Brinks, seeking vengeance on them in unrealistic fashions. Angela often imagines unusual things happening to her enemies, especially Nanette, including getting tossed into the air during an ice routine and falling through the ice, or getting turned into a flash card, among other things.
Johnny Abatti (voiced by Al Mukadam) is a sweet but dim boy of Italian descent. His parents are never seen in the show and he appears to be under the care of his grandmother Carmella and uncle Nicky, the latter of whom often pressures Johnny into manhood (particularly in the episode "Johnny Learns to Swing"). Regarded as an attractive student, Johnny takes pride in his pompadour hairstyle. Nanette Manoir harbours a crush on him and tries to flirt with him frequently, referring to him as "John" and inviting him to exclusive Manoir events. He normally brings Angela, Gina, and Gordy along against their will. Despite this preferential treatment, Johnny remains utterly clueless about Nanette's affections. Although he never admits it, Johnny may have strong feelings for Angela, as he becomes resentful of any rival for her affections. On every Valentine's Day, Johnny sends Angela flowers but forgets to sign the attached card, accidentally giving the credit for his gift to Angela's imaginary boyfriend Bob. Johnny likes to pick his nose and shoot spit balls.
Gina Lash (voiced by Bryn McAuley) is the smartest child in her grade. Possessing encyclopedic knowledge, an impressive vocabulary, and a voracious appetite, Gina routinely dispenses reason and insight to her friends. However, she will always participate in whatever scheme they are partaking. Gina shares many interests with her friends, but her thirst for knowledge has led her to pursue a variety of other hobbies; she owns a microscope and other scientific paraphernalia. Gina is best known for her appetite, which rivals that of any adult. She is always hungry and can even fall prey to Nanette Manoir if she is bribed with her gourmet chef's cooking. Gina's favorite foods include Abatti's Pizza, cinnamon swirls, jiggly fruit, and Tastee Swirl ice cream. Gina worships the mascot for Tastee Swirl, a man with a whipped ice cream head who dispenses frozen treats from his truck to the local children. She also idolizes the maker of her favorite cupcake snack, Tiny Dottie, as a professional food entrepreneur she wants to be like. Gina lives with her mother, who is single (until she begins dating Gordy's father Coach Rhinehart). Her father is never seen or mentioned on the show, implying that her mother is divorced or widowed. Gina also owns a pet turtle named Sheldon who loves to eat carrots.
Gordy Rhinehart (voiced by Edward Glen) is a kind, sensitive, and artistic boy with asthma who prefers pressing flowers, housework, and writing poetry instead of "dangerous" activities like tag or hide-and-seek. He has a love of ballet and nature, and embraces all things pretty and lovely. He is best known for his many allergies. Gordy wears large, square spectacles and a blue vest. He is the complete opposite of his burly and macho ex-Army soldier father Coach Rhinehart. Despite being so unalike, their father/son relationship is very strong and they show genuine love and concern for one another. The coach enjoys the strawberry soufflés, hand-embroidered towels, and pillow cases Gordy makes in his free time. Gordy loves animals and is the proud owner of an immaculately groomed dog named Fabio. He is an expert on pet care and worries about the welfare of any animal entrusted to Angela. Gordy spent almost an entire episode ("Gordy in a Plastic Bubble") wearing rubber gloves and a face mask, refusing to leave his house, after looking at an eyelash under a microscope. In spite of Gordy's outward appearance and mannerisms, he is deeply in love with Gina Lash.
Nanette Manoir (voiced by Ruby Smith-Merovitz) is the teacher's pet who speaks with a snobbish faux-French accent. Her hair is golden blonde and styled into long Victorian-style ringlets in emulation of her mother's look. Nanette's doting parents fail to see how rotten their daughter really acts at school, as she is spoiled and never punished her for things she does wrong. She is proud of her pampered looks, constantly bouncing her curled hair. Nanette's interests are a posh variety of activities such as baton twirling, ballet, painting, gymnastics, and ice skating. She uses her family's wealth and high status as a way of asserting her superiority over her classmates, especially Angela. Because of her French name and heritage, Nanette believes that she can actually understand and speak French. This belief is shared only by her mother, Bunny. She adds misapplied French phrases to most of her conversations, explaining their meanings incorrectly; for example, she believes "liaison" (a close bond or connection) is French for "lesson", "crème brûlée" (singed cream) is French for "prove it", and "pomme de terre" (potato) is French for "apple polisher".
Mrs. Ephigenia Brinks (voiced by Richard Binsley) is a middle-aged woman and a dedicated third grade teacher with a rather masculine voice. She wears a grey beehive wig, which hides her short ginger hair, and dresses in a long-skirted schoolmarm dress. She is easily manipulated and plays favorites, her decisions always favoring Nanette. Unfortunately, Mrs. Brinks dislikes Angela and is very strict and callous with her. Mrs. Brinks likes to believe that she is sophisticated and succumbs easily to flattery. She considers Angela a bizarre, troublemaking, and wayward girl and constantly punishes her. She and her long-suffering husband Connie are rumored to be weekend nudists. Angela and her gang often peer into the Brinks' backyard from Angela's tree house to find out if this rumor is true, though the show only shows Angela and her friends' reactions to what they see. In "Brinks of No Return", Mr. Brinks reveals that he and Mrs. Brinks used to have a very loving relationship before Nanette came into her life. In the episode "Earhart's Heirloom" Mrs. Brinks claims to have the compass of Amelia Earhart and promises to show it to the class if they behave for a month, only for them to discover that the compass is fake. Brinks has an artificial hip which prevents her from dancing.

Recurring 
Astronaut Bob (voiced by Robert Smith) is the local hero of Tapwater Springs whom Angela and her friends lionize. As his name suggests, he was an astronaut presumably during the height of the Space Race who got to walk on the moon. He currently spends his time as a volunteer for the town's space museum, and lending his likeness to boxes of the cereal Astro Nutties as well as other products and possessions.  
Candy May (voiced by Linda Kash) is an incredibly dim child who appears to cut her own hair and wears a shirt with a unicorn decal on it. She has long red hair in a ribbon. She hesitates a lot, draws her words out, and often confuses herself. She is not allowed near sharp objects and loves playing with glitter and paste. She may be older than the other kids and is unsurprisingly the tallest child in the classroom, but this is due to being held back a year due to her low intelligence. Her presence is marked by a slow instrumental version of "Pop Goes the Weasel". 
Carmella "Nonna" Abatti (voiced by Linda Kash) is Johnny's grandmother and chief proprietor of Abatti's Pizzeria. A talented cook and nurturer, Nonna is very hospitable to Johnny and his friends. She is also not afraid to speak her mind about things, particularly her son Nicky's lifestyle choices or Gina Lash's appetite. Additionally, Nonna is highly superstitious, most notably regarding "Chi Mallochio" (or, the evil eye), as evidenced when Nicky starts enjoying the success at the expense of Sabatto's, the town's rival pizzeria. In her younger days, she was good friends with Angela's Grandmother, Louisa.
Coach Rhinehart (voiced by Robert Smith) is Gordy's hyper masculine father as well as a big sports enthusiast, ex-Army officer, football coach, Nature Survival Counselor, and  PE teacher of Tapwater Springs Elementary School. He speaks with a stereotypical coach/drill sergeant voice and is usually shown dressed in a bright orange tracksuit. Like Gina's mom, Coach Rhinehart's spouse is not shown implying he's either a widower, divorced, or living apart from his wife. He is the second of the Tapwater teachers to show anger at Nanette Manoir. In spite of being fiercely competitive and obsessed with physical activity of any kind, he is accepting of his son's personality and artistic interests, encouraging him to be himself, and not projecting his image of manhood onto him. His first name has never been revealed canonically.
Conrad "Connie" Brinks  (voiced by Richard Binsley) is the henpecked husband of Ephegenia Brinks. In contrast to his wife, Conrad is skinny, soft-spoken, and even tempered. He is very loving and patient especially towards his wife, and dismisses her shouting with a resigned "yes dear". He secretly resents the relationship Nanette has with Mrs. Brinks, referring to her on one occasion as "little Naninski Buttinski". Conrad works for the town's public-access television station where he has pull enough to host a program for ham radio enthusiasts like himself, and once coached an ice skating class for the town's children. In his younger years Conrad was an avid bowler and allegedly the dreamiest boy in all of Tapwater Springs. He even used to go out with Johnny and Angela's grandmothers before meeting Mrs. Brinks. Like his wife, Conrad also is rumored to engage in weekend nudism.
Howell (voiced by Robert Smith) and Bunny Manoir (voiced by Julie Lemieux) are the equally rich and vapid parents of Angela's primary nemesis Nanette Manoir. Though Nanette claims she is fully French, Howell speaks with a strong Massachusetts accent, a la John F. Kennedy, while Bunny has a Southern accent.  Howell works as a proprietor of a construction firm. Bunny spends her days presumably as a lady of leisure. Both are very overindulgent of their daughter, and most of the time they fail to notice let alone punish Nanette's rotten attitude. Much like their daughter, Howell and Bunny have little regard for William and Geneva Anaconda as people. 
January Cole (voiced by Olivia Garratt) and Karlene Trainor (voiced by Annick Obonsawin) are Nanette's servants who follow her around wherever she goes.  Sporting bouffant hairdos, preppy clothing, and beauty moles, they are very concerned with their appearance and look to Nanette for fashion guidance (mainly about facials and makeup). Despite their unyielding devotion to Nanette, they are fickle. 
Jimmy Jamal (voiced by Kevin Duhaney) is an athletic boy in Angela's class. He is frequently seen playing a hand-held video game and talking about his Turbo Trainers, which make him run very fast. He is the son of the mayor of Tapwater Springs.
Josephine Praline (voiced by Cara Pifko) is a devout Catholic who acts as a moral rudder for her classmates. She is loving and forgiving, but stern when she sees injustice. Josephine often refers to others as "my child". She set up a confessional in the girls' washroom, where her friends come to talk to her about their stresses and worries. She is well liked by her classmates, but Mrs. Brinks cares very little about her. Josephine urges Angela to learn to love her enemies and see the good in Nanette instead of hating her, but is surprised when she cannot find any good qualities herself. Josephine comes from a large family of at least nineteen brothers and sisters.   
Mark and Derek Anaconda (both voiced by Rob Tinkler) are Angela's  twin older brothers. Though physically and intellectually similar, Mark has blonde hair and wears a white Jersey with the number 14, while Derek brown hair and wears a plain orange shirt. Moreover, Derek's voice is higher than Mark's. Both of the brothers are the secondary antagonists of the show, constantly bullying and belittling Angela and her friends. Though dull-witted, each roast their sister at every turn; high-fiving and head-butting each other when one makes a particularly "witty" remark. They refer to nearly everyone as "dude" (regardless of the gender and/or social status of the individual in question) and tend to judge how good something is in life by acknowledging when things "rock"/"rule". Despite their irresponsibility and lack of interpersonal skills, Mark and Derek have held jobs at the town country club as caddies and at a fast food eatery when they fail to pay for their meal. Both enjoy contact sports and are on the town football team, much to Coach Rhinehart's consternation. Their presence is marked by a heavy metal riff vaguely similar to the common ‘Nyah nyah nyah nyah nyah nyah’ chant, traditionally sung by children to mock others.    
Nicholas "Uncle Nicky" Abatti (voiced by Ron Rubin) is Johnny's swinging bachelor uncle and co-owner of Abatti's Pizzeria. While generally good natured towards his nephew as well as Angela, Gina and Gordy, Uncle Nicky is also childish, and obsessed with fast women, faster cars, gambling and disco. His clothes usually consist of sunglasses, gold chains and leisure suits. As a child he was known as a troublemaker in Mrs. Brinks' class; earning the nickname "Fancy Pants" and leaving his legacy in the form of an eternal spitball. Uncle Nicky is more often than not escorted by two nameless babes (a blonde on his left and a redhead on his right) wherever he goes, a testament to him being a ladies man. Despite this, he has been known to publicly express interest in Gina's mother, Elizabeth Lash. 
William (voiced by Diego Matamoros) and Geneva Anaconda (voiced by Allegra Fulton) are the parents of Mark, Derek, Angela and Lulu Anaconda. Though Bill enjoys inventing, none of his inventions have really taken off (save for the Food Rejuvenator 3000, whose potential success he sabotaged in the end out of fear that success would spoil his family). To make ends meet, he works as a salesman selling ceramic dancing pigs and expandable foam in a can. Geneva is a struggling artist who gets by on commissions and teaching positions at the community college. In spite of being busy with their respective jobs and financial situation, both are caring and provide Angela and her siblings with love and support.

Production and development

Conception 
Created by Joanna Ferrone and Sue Rose, the show began as a series of shorts on the Nickelodeon sketch comedy series, KaBlam! Decode Entertainment and C.O.R.E. Digital Pictures developed Angela Anaconda into a long-form series in 1999.

Animation 
The show features cutout animation, in which characters are created using black-and-white photographs. The production studio, C.O.R.E. Digital Pictures, used Elastic Reality software to superimpose models' faces onto computer-generated bodies and backgrounds.

Broadcast and release 
The show aired on Fox Family Channel, Nickelodeon and Starz Kids and Family in the United States. Teletoon aired it in Canada. Internationally, the series was broadcast on Nickelodeon or Cartoon Network were available and Channel 4 in the United Kingdom.

Although the series has not had a full DVD release, the first twenty episodes were distributed across four volumes in Australia, where the program is broadcast on Nickelodeon Australia. It was also broadcast on the ABC during the late 1990s until the early 2010s.

In France, an Angela Anaconda channel is available on Pluto TV.

Reception

Critical response 
Angela Anaconda received high ratings and mixed to negative reviews from critics. Barb Stuewe of The Ledger noted that while "the humor doesn't always come off," the show "is sometimes quite funny." Evan Levine of the Rome News-Tribune was critical of the show's look and feel, stating that "the series' unique, cut-out style of animation seems trendy for its own sake." Scott Moore of The Washington Post called Angela Anaconda "more imaginative than anything ever seen in art class." Co-creator Sue Rose noted in an interview with The New York Times that despite having a primarily female cast, the show had become popular with both sexes. She writes, "the most frequent feedback we get is from parents of boys ... they say: 'My boys watch it and they love it. I never thought they would.' These are not just girls' shows, they're kids shows."

The Sydney Morning Herald gave it the award for best children's show of 2001, call it a "cute and sassy animation".

Ratings 
During the series' time on Fox Family, it received consistently high ratings and was commonly marathoned by the channel.

Awards and nominations

References

External links 

 

1999 American television series debuts
2001 American television series endings
1990s American animated television series
2000s American animated television series
1999 Canadian television series debuts
2001 Canadian television series endings
1990s Canadian animated television series
2000s Canadian animated television series
American children's animated comedy television series
Canadian children's animated comedy television series
KaBlam!
Teletoon original programming
Fox Kids
Television series by DHX Media
Television series created by Sue Rose
Television shows set in the United States
English-language television shows
Television shows filmed in Toronto
Animated television series about children